Exercise Valiant Shield is one of the largest United States military war games held in the Pacific Ocean. Nine Valiant Shield exercises were conducted between 2006 and 2022. According to the Navy, Valiant Shield focuses on cooperation between military branches and on the detection, tracking, and engagement of units at sea, in the air, and on land in response to a wide range of missions.

It was the largest military exercise to be conducted by the United States in Pacific waters since the Vietnam War, and it was also the first time observers from the People's Republic of China were allowed to view U.S. wargames. The exercise marked the first of what will become biennial exercises involving different branches of the U.S. military.

Valiant Shield 2006 included Navy, Air Force, Marine Corps, and Coast Guard units.  Air operations included thousands of sorties as well as in-air refuelings and parachute deployments.  Aircraft from Valiant Shield deployed on missions ranging across the Pacific all the way to Alaska.  Ships simulated anti-submarine warfare. Valiant Shield 2006 was the first time that three carrier strike groups had operated together in the Pacific in over ten years. Forces exercised a wide range of skills, including maritime interdiction; defense counter-air; intelligence, surveillance and reconnaissance; and command and control.

Observers

Observers from the Chinese People's Liberation Army Navy were invited to attend, as were naval officers from India, Singapore, Japan, Australia, South Korea, Russia, Indonesia, and  Malaysia. It was the first time observers from the People's Republic of China had ever been sent to observe U.S. war games.  China sent a ten-person delegation, including one high-ranking officer each from its navy, army, and air force, as well as officials from its foreign ministry.  According to USA Today, Chinese military observers said that observing the exercises gave them a better understanding of U.S. weapons and tactics. Rear Admiral Zhang Leiyu, leader of the delegation, called the visit to the war games near Guam "a positive step in China-U.S. military ties."

Military ties between the United States and China have not been close ever since a communist government came to power in China. Admiral William J. Fallon, the top U.S. commander in the Pacific, said it was "a start" that China accepted his invitation to observe the large-scale exercises. Fallon indicated before the exercises began that he expected China to reciprocate. However, neither Zhang or the Xinhua report gave any indication that such an invitation was forthcoming.

The exercise had implications for other world events as well, including acting as a show of force to possibly deter North Korea from test-firing its new Taepodong-2 missile.

Participating forces

The following U.S. forces participated in Valiant Shield 2006:

Joint Task Force 519 staff, Pearl Harbor, Hawaii
Joint Task Force 519 Joint Force Air Component Command, Kenney Headquarters, Hickam AFB, Hawaii
Joint Task Force 519 Joint Force Maritime Component Command, aboard

United States Navy

Carrier Strike Group Five/Kitty Hawk Carrier Strike Group
USS Kitty Hawk, (CV-63), United States Fleet Activities Yokosuka, Japan
Carrier Air Wing Five (CVW-5), Naval Air Facility Atsugi, Japan
USS Cowpens, (CG-63), Yokosuka, Japan
USS John S. McCain, (DDG-56), Yokosuka, Japan
USS Vandegrift, (FFG-48), Yokosuka, Japan
USS Lassen, (DDG-82), Yokosuka, Japan
USS Curtis Wilbur, (DDG-54), Yokosuka, Japan
USS Fitzgerald, (DDG-62), Yokosuka, Japan

Carrier Strike Group Nine/Abraham Lincoln Carrier Strike Group
USS Abraham Lincoln, (CVN-72), Naval Station Everett, Wash.
Carrier Air Wing Two (CVW-2), Naval Air Station Lemoore, California
USS Mobile Bay, (CG-53), Naval Station San Diego, Calif.
USS Shoup, (DDG-86), Everett, Wash.
USS Russell, (DDG-59) Pearl Harbor, Hawaii

Carrier Strike Group Seven/Ronald Reagan Carrier Strike Group
USS Ronald Reagan, (CVN-76), San Diego, Calif.
Carrier Air Wing Fourteen (CVW-14), Lemoore, Calif.
USS Decatur, (DDG-73), San Diego, Calif.
USS Lake Champlain, (CG-57), San Diego, Calif.
USS McCampbell, (DDG-85), San Diego, Calif.
USNS Rainier, (T-AOE-7), Naval Base Bremerton, Washington

Other Navy Units
USS Blue Ridge, (LCC-19), Yokosuka, Japan
USS Houston, (SSN-713), Guam
USS Honolulu, (SSN-718), Pearl Harbor, Hawaii
USS Hampton, (SSN-767)
USS Key West, (SSN-722)
USS City of Corpus Christi, (SSN-705), Guam
USS Tucson, (SSN-770), Pearl Harbor, Hawaii 
USS Frank Cable (AS-40), Apra Harbor, Guam
USNS Impeccable, (T-AGS-23)
RV Cory Chouest
MV PFC James Anderson Jr., (T-AK-3002)
MV MAJ Bernard F. Fisher, (T-AK-4396)
USNS Watson, (T-AKR-310)
SS Cape Jacob, (T-AK-5029)
SS Petersburg, (T-AOT-9101)
Helicopter Anti-Submarine Light 51 (HSL-51), SH-60 Detachments 1,2,3,4,6,11, Atsugi, Japan
VP-9 (Patrol Squadron Nine), P-3C Detachment, Kaneohe, Hawaii
Fleet Air Reconnaissance Squadron One, EP-3E Detachment, Misawa, Japan
Strategic Communications Wing One, E-6 Mercury Detachment

United States Air Force

13th Air Force/Kenney Headquarters (PACAF) 
Pacific Air Operations Center, Hickam AFB, Hawaii
36th Wing, Andersen AFB, Guam

Fifth Air Force
18th Wing, Kadena AB, Okinawa, Japan (F-15C/KC-135/E-3)
35th Fighter Wing, Misawa AB, Japan (F-16CJ)

Eighth Air Force
509th Bomb Wing, Whiteman AFB, Missouri (B-2)

11th Air Force (PACAF)
3rd Wing, Elmendorf AFB, Alaska (F-15E)

Eighteenth Air Force
60th Air Mobility Wing, Travis AFB California (KC-10)
305th Air Mobility Wing, McGuire AFB New Jersey (KC-10)

New York Air National Guard
107th Air Refueling Wing, Niagara Falls International Airport (KC-135)

United States Marine Corps
 I Marine Expeditionary Force, Camp Pendleton, California
 III Marine Expeditionary Force, Okinawa, Japan

United States Coast Guard
USCGC Galveston Island (WPB-1349), Guam

References

External links

2006 in military history
Military exercises involving the United States
United States Navy in the 21st century